Nicholas Bernard Wilkie Boulle (born March 28, 1989) is an American-British professional racing driver, athlete, entrepreneur and jeweler from Dallas, Texas.

Racing career 
Boulle began racing go karts at the age of 12 and went on to compete nationally as an official VW Motorsport Junior Driver.  In 2016, he earned a 2nd place finish at the ROLEX 24 Hours of Daytona in the PC class with PR1 Motorsports where he drove alongside Jose Gutierrez, Robert Alon and Tom Kimbersmith. Later that year he placed 3rd in PC (Prototype Challenge) in the Lone Star Le Mans with co-driver James French.  In January 2017, Boulle became the first ever Rolex dealer to win the ROLEX 24 Hours of Daytona Prototype Challenge. His team was composed of Kyle Masson, Patricio O'Ward and James French.  He then came in 2nd place in the IMSA Weather Tech Sports Car Championship at Circuit of the Americas.  In 2018 he raced for a third time in the ROLEX 24 Hours of Daytona and came in 12th in his class.  A few months later, Boulle debuted in the 24 Hours of Le Mans as a part of Jackie Chan DC Racing’s team, alongside drivers David Cheng and Pierre Nicolet.  The team came in 8th in the LMP2 class.

Personal life 
Boulle graduated from Southern Methodist University and earned his BBA at the Cox School of Business. For several years he competed with the Elbowz Racing Elite Cycling Team and was medaled at the USA Cycling Collegiate National Cycling Championship for SMU Cycling in the D2 division. After University he founded a digital marketing firm called WowBirds and in 2015 began working at his family’s business, de Boulle Diamond & Jewelry.

Racing record

American Open-Wheel racing results
(key) (Races in bold indicate pole position, races in italics indicate fastest race lap)

Complete USF2000 National Championship results

Complete 24 Hours of Le Mans results

Complete WeatherTech SportsCar Championship results
(key) (Races in bold indicate pole position; results in italics indicate fastest lap)

References 

Living people
1989 births
24 Hours of Daytona drivers
24 Hours of Le Mans drivers
Larbre Compétition drivers
FIA World Endurance Championship drivers
AFS Racing drivers
WeatherTech SportsCar Championship drivers